Syan may refer to:

Syan language, a Bantu language
Sabrina Syan, Italian actress
Syan Blake, British actress

See also 
Sayan (disambiguation)
Sian (disambiguation)
Cyan (disambiguation)